UCEA could refer to:

University Council for Educational Administration
Universities and Colleges Employers Association

See also 
 Ucea, a commune in Romania
 Ucea (river), a river in Romania